The South Asia Free Media Association (SAFMA) is a non-governmental organization of media representatives from SAARC member countries. SAFMA runs the South Asia Media School since 2007 and also published the South Asian Journal.

Presidents
 Muhammad Ziauddin (2002-2006)

References

Journalism organizations in Asia
Freedom of expression organizations
Freedom of the press
Non-profit organizations based in Asia